Kuttanad is a region covering the Alappuzha, Kottayam and Pathanamthitta Districts, in the state of Kerala, India, well known for its vast paddy fields and geographical peculiarities. Kuttanad is historically important in the ancient history of South India and is the major rice producer in the state. Farmers of Kuttanad are famous for Biosaline Farming. Food and Agriculture Organization (FAO) has declared the Kuttanad Farming System as a Globally Important Agricultural Heritage System (GIAHS).

Four of Kerala's major rivers, the Pamba, Meenachil, Achankovil and Manimala flow into the region. It is well known for its boat race in the Punnamada Backwaters, known in Malayalam as Vallamkalli.

History 

The first recorded history of this land is obtained from the Sangam period literature. According to the Sangam era texts, Uthiyan Cheralatan (Perum Chorru Udiyan Cheralathan, Athan I or Udiyanjeral) is the first recorded Chera dynasty ruler of the Sangam period in ancient Kerala. 

He had his capital at a place called Kuzhumur in Kuttanad (central Kerala) and expanded the kingdom northward and eastward from his original homeland. His lifetime is broadly determined to be between first century BC and 2nd century AD. His queen was Veliyan Nallini, the daughter of Veliyan Venman.

Uthiyan Cheralathan was a contemporary of the Chola ruler Karikala Chola. He is praised for his elephant corps and cavalry. Present day Changanacherry end of Kuttanad was the capital of the Chera dynasty king Uthiyan Cheralathan. 

His descendant was Cenkuttuvan (Chenkuttuvan means "Alluring Kuttuvan" in Malayalam) and his name is carried by the towns of Chenganacherri and Chengana to the present day).
The native place of the Kuttuva tribe came to be known as Kuttanadu. According to sangam literature, Uthiyan Cheralathan was defeated in the Battle of Venni against Karikala Chola and the capital was burnt down.

Black wooden logs were mined from paddy fields called as "Karinilam" ("black paddy fields") until the recent past. In Kuttanad most of the place names end in 'kari' (meaning burnt residue or charcoal). Some familiar place names are Ramankary, Puthukkary, Amichakary, Oorukkary, Mithrakary, Mampuzhakary, Kainakary, Kandanakary, Thayamkary, Chathenkary, Chathurthiakary and Chennamkary.

Geography

Divisions
The Kuttanad region is categorised into:
 Lower Kuttanad
 Upper Kuttanad
 North Kuttanad

Lower Kuttanadu comprises taluks of Ambalapuzha, Nedumudy, Kuttanadu (excluding Edathua, Thalavady, Kidangara and Muttar), and the northern half of Karthikapally taluk in Alappuzha district.

Upper Kuttanad comprises Veeyapuram and Pallippad in Karthikapally taluk, Edathua, Thalavady, Kidangara and Muttar in Kuttanad taluk; Chennithala and Thripperumthura villages in Mavelikkara taluk; Mannar, Kurattissery, Budhanoor, Ennakkad villages in Chengannur taluk of Alappuzha district; and Parumala, Kadapra, Niranam, Pulikeezhu, Nedumpuram, Chathenkary, Peringara, and Kavumbhagam villages in Pathanamthitta district.

North Kuttanad comprises Vaikom taluk, western parts of Kottayam taluk, and western parts of Changanacherry taluk in Kottayam district.

Villages 
Kuttanad's major villages include Kainakary, Chathenkary, Ramankary, Puthukkary, Chennamkary, Nedumudi, Niranam, Kaipuzha, Edathua, Mampuzhakkary, Neelamperoor, Kainady, Kavalam, Pulincunnoo, Manalady, Kannady Kayalpuram, Veliyanadu, Veeyapuram, Vezhapra, Kunnamkary, Kumaramkary, Valady, Kidangara, Mithrakary, Muttar, Neerattupuram, Thalavadi, Changankary, Champakulam, Nedumudi, Moonnatummukham, Melpadom, Pulincunnu, Pallippad, Payippad, Karichal, Ayaparambu, Anary, Vellamkulangara, Pilappuzha, Pandi, Edathua, Pacha, Chekkidikad, Thakazhy, Cheruthana, Karuvatta, Chennithala, Narakathara, Venattukad, Kayalppuram, Mankompu, Chathurthiakary, Koduppunna, Oorukkary, Thayankary, Thiruvarpu,Kumarakom, Arpookara, Pullangadi, Payattupakka, and Kandankary.

Backwater paddy cultivation (Kayal cultivation) 

The major occupation in Kuttanadu is farming, with rice the most important agricultural product. This activity gives the area its moniker of "The Rice Bowl of Kerala". Large farming areas near Vembanad Lake were reclaimed from the lake. The history of paddy cultivation in Kuttanad can be traced back centuries. The evolution of paddy cultivation correlated with technological advancement and changes in the regulatory framework that existed during the 19th and 20th centuries. In earlier times, reclamation was carried out mainly from the shallow part of the Vembanad Lake or from the periphery of the Pamba River. These reclamations constituted small areas of paddy fields called padasekharams. Bailing out of water from the fields were done manually using water wheels called chakram. Gradually the manual method used for bailing out of water gave way to steam engines.

There were robberies in Kuttanad in earlier days, which were prohibited by the Travancore Maharajah Moolam Thirunal.

Three distinct stages can be identified in the reclamation of kayal lands from the lake. The first stage was carried out by private entrepreneurs without any financial support from the government. The Pattom Proclamation made by the Travencore Kingdom in 1865, gave a great fillip to reclamation activities between 1865 and 1888. During this period de-watering of the polders was done manually using chakram, which restricted large-scale reclamation. Only about 250 hectares of land were reclaimed during this period. Venadu kayal and Madathil Kayal were reclaimed during this period and are considered the first "Kayal Nilams" to be reclaimed from the Vembanad Lake. These pioneering reclamation activities in kayal cultivation were made by the two brothers Mathai Luka Pallithanam and Ouseph Luka Pallithanam from Kainady village in Kuttanadu.

The second phase started during 1888. One of the reclamation during this period was undertaken by Chalayil Eravi Kesava Panicker.  He chose to reclaim Vembanad kayal from the mouth of the Chennamkari river as it joins with the back waters. The reclaimed kayal was known as ‘ Attumuttu Kayal’. Other major reclamation on the same year was Seminary Kayal which was undertaken by Kottayam Orthodox Seminary.

The introduction of kerosene engines for dewatering resulted in the reclamation of wider areas of the lake for cultivation. This made farmers consider venturing into the deeper parts of the lake. During the period between 1898 and 1903, reclamation activity was led by Pallithanam Luca Mathai (alias Pallithanathu Mathaichen) who reclaimed the Cherukara Kayal and Pallithanam Moovayiram Kayal. But the second phase (1890 to 1903) of reclamation activities came to a halt because of the ban on kayal reclamation imposed by the Madras Government in 1903. Cherukali Kayal, Rajapuram Kayal, Aarupanku Kayal, Pantharndu Panku kayal and Mathi Kayal were the other major reclamations during this period.

In 1912, the Madras Government approved a proposal from the Travancore Government for further reclamations in three stages. Under this scheme kayal land was notified for reclamation in blocks each named with a letter of the English alphabet. Out of the total area of 19,500 acres of kayal land, 12,000 acres were reclaimed between 1913 and 1920. After the removal of the ban in 1913, Pallithanam Luca Matthai along with some other prominent families in Kuttanadu, reclaimed E-Block Kayal measuring a total area 2,400 acres. This is the biggest Kayal Nilam in Kuttanadu. C.J. Kurian, Ex MLC and Mr. John Illikalam were his main partners in this venture. The reclamations between 1914 and 1920, known as the new reclamations, were carried out in three periods. In the first period Blocks A to G measuring 6300 Acres were reclaimed. C Block, D Block (Attumukham Aarayiram (Attumuttu Kayal), Thekke Aarayiram and Vadakke Aarayiram) and E Block (Erupathinalayiram Kayal) F Block (Judge's Aarayiram Kayal) and G Block (Kochu Kayal) are the major Kayal Nilams reclaimed during this period.

During the second period of new reclamation, blocks H to N covering an area of 3600 acres were reclaimed under the leadership of Pallithanam Luca Matthai, Cunnumpurathu Kurien, Vachaparampil Mathen, Pazhayaparmpil Chacko, Kunnathusseril Peious, Ettuparayil Xavier and Pattassery PP Mathai. During the third period of new reclamation, R Block Kayal covering 1,400 acres was reclaimed by the joint efforts of eight families led by then member of Sree Moolam Popular Assembly, Pallithanam Luca Matthai. His partners in the reclamation included Vachaparampil Mathen, Pazhayaparmpil Chacko, Ettuparayil Xavier, Pattassery PP Mathai, Kaarikkuzhi Ponnada Vaakkaal Mathulla Mappila (E & F block), Meledom, Paruthickal and Kandakudy. Once, while the king of travancore visited the Erupathinalayiram Kayal he was pleased and told Kaarikkuzhi Mathulla Mappila that he should have bought a Ponnada to honor him. Since he has not bought a Ponnada, he presented "Ponnada Vaakkaal" (Ponnada by word). Thereafter his house was known as Ponnadavaakkaal.

From 1920 to 1940 reclamation activity came to a halt because of a steep drop in the price of rice.

Due to the steep decline in the price of rice between 1920 and 1940 reclamation activities slowed down, but they gained momentum again in the early 1940s. During this period, in order to increase agricultural output, a government initiated "Grow More Food" campaign and the provision of incentives encouraged new reclamations. The advent of electric motors made reclamation relatively easier, cheaper and less risky as compared to in earlier periods. The last tract of the reclamations namely Q, S and T block were made during this period by Joseph Murickan (Muricken Outhachan) and his wife's family Puthanppura Panchara (Veliyanadu).

As farming in the area increased, farmers felt themselves constrained by the two cycles a year for rice cultivation. The reason for which is the limited availability of potable water in Kuttanadu. During the monsoon seasons, the water from the mountains flow through the rivers to the sea, bringing potable water to Kuttanadu. But during summer, due to the low level of the region seawater enters Kuttanadu, significantly increasing the salinity of the water and making it unpotable.

Kuttanad is also recognised as a Globally Important Agricultural Heritage Systems (GIAHS) by FAO.

Thottappally Spillway
Thottappally Spillway project was designed as a permanent solution to the flood situation in Kuttanad. This programme was envisaged in such a way that flood waters from Pamba, Manimalayar and Achankovil were diverted to the sea before it reached Vembanad lake. The spillway was commissioned in 1955.

In 1968, the Government of India proposed that a bund (Dam) be made across the river so that seawater would not be allowed to come inside Kuttanad during summer, allowing farmers to cultivate an extra crop per year. The project was planned in three phases, the south side, the north side and another phase to join the two sections. The project was delayed and by the time the first two phases were complete the entire money allotted for the project ran out and left the final phase in limbo. The farmers who were expecting many financial benefits after the completion of the project decided to take matters into their own hands and one night in 1972, a large group of farmers filled the gap between the north and the south side with earth. To this day, the earth embankment between the two sections of the bund remains. With this, it was possible to close the regulator of shutters during December–June when the saline water enters, and then open it during monsoon. Once the Thanneermukkam bund and spillway became operational two crops were possible in Kuttanad.

Even though the bund has improved the quality of life of the farmers, the bund is alleged to have caused severe environmental problems. The backwaters which were abundant with fish and part of the staple food of the people of the region require a small amount of salt water for its breeding. The bund has caused deterioration of fish varieties in the region and the fishermen opposed to the bund as of 2005. The bund has also disrupted the harmony of the sea with the backwaters and has caused problems not foreseen before the bund like the omnipresence of the water weeds. Before creation of the bund the salt water tended to cleanse the backwaters, but this no longer occurs, leading to pollution of the backwaters and the nearby land.

Notable natives and residents

Politics 
Kuttanad assembly constituency was a part of Alappuzha. After the Lok Sabha delimitation in 2008, it now belongs to the Mavelikkara constituency.

See also 
 Alappuzha
 Thekkekara
 Thakazhy 
 Edathua
 Kavalam
 Champakulam
 Kandankary
 Kainakary
 Chengannur
 Mavelikara
 Kayamkulam
 Kunnumma
Ramankary

References

Further reading 

 Thirst Below Sea Level, M Suchitra, The Hindu, 15 July 2003
 KT Rammohan. Tales of Rice: Kuttanad, Southwest India. Centre for Development Studies, Thiruvananthapuram, 2006. 
 KT Rammohan. 2008. 'Rice Fields Reclamation in Southern India' in Helaine Selin (ed). Encyclopaedia of the History of Science, Technology, and Medicine in Non-Western Cultures. Vol. 2. Berlin, Heidelberg and New York: Springer-Verlag. 
Regions of Kerala
Landforms of Kerala
Lowest points
Pamba River
Geography of Alappuzha district
Geography of Kottayam district